The history of the Jews in Madeira spans the entire length of the history of Madeira itself. The history of Madeira begins with the discovery of the islands by Portugal in 1419. Madeira is presently officially the Autonomous Region of Madeira (Região Autónoma da Madeira), and is one of the two autonomous regions of Portugal (along with the Azores). It is an archipelago situated in the north Atlantic Ocean, southwest of Portugal. Its total population was estimated in 2016 at 289,000. The capital of Madeira is Funchal, which is located on the main island's south coast.    

Jews have been associated with Madeira from the era of Crypto-Jews to World War II evacuees. Like the Jews of mainland Portugal, Madeira Jews are mainly related to Sephardi history, a Jewish ethnic division that represents communities who have originated in the Iberian Peninsula. There was once a Synagogue of Funchal, which is now disused.

Menasseh Ben Israel was born in Madeira in 1604.

Jews from Morocco arrived in 1819 and set themselves up in the cloth and wine trades. The Abudarham family from Gibraltar were involved in the Madeira wine industry from the early 1860s onward.

The Jewish community on the island of Madeira expanded in 1940, due to the Evacuation of the Gibraltarian civilian population during World War II to Madeira, which included a number of Jews, who attended the Synagogue of Funchal. Some of these evacuees were buried in the Jewish Cemetery of Funchal.

Tito Benady, a historian on Gibraltar Jewry, noted that when some 200 Jews of the 2000 evacuees from Gibraltar were evacuated as non combatants to Funchal, Madeira, at the start of World War II, they found a Jewish cemetery (Jewish Cemetery of Funchal) that belonged to the Abudarham family. The same family after whom the Abudarham Synagogue in Gibraltar was named.

The Jewish Cemetery of Funchal is a Jewish cemetery located in Rua do Lazareto, Funchal, Madeira. Sephardi Jews as well as Ashkenazi Jews are buried there.

In 2008, a monument was made in Gibraltar and shipped to Madeira, where it has been erected next to a small chapel at Santa Caterina park, Funchal. The monument is a gift and symbol of everlasting thanks given by the people of Gibraltar to the island of Madeira and its inhabitants.

The city of Funchal and Gibraltar were twinned on 13 May 2009 by their then mayors, the mayor of Funchal Miguel Albuquerque and the mayor of Gibraltar, who had been an evacuee from Gibraltar to Madeira Solomon Levy, respectively. The mayor of Gibraltar then had a meeting with the then president of Madeira Alberto João Jardim.

In 2013, a Passover Seder was held in Madeira sponsored by Shavei Israel and was attended by Bnei Anousim/Crypto-Jews.

See also
 Synagogue of Funchal
 Jewish Cemetery of Funchal
 Lançados

References

Madeira
Madeira
History of Madeira